Adla Khan is a Pakistani actress. She is known for her roles in dramas Kaisi Aurat Hoon Main, Kasak Rahay Ge, Baba Jani, Tera Yahan Koi Nahin, Inteqam and Fitrat.

Early life
Adla was born in 1990 on 19th October in Lahore, Pakistan. She completed her studies from University of Lahore.

Career
Adla made her acting debut in 2012 on PTV and appeared in PTV dramas. She was noted for her roles in dramas Koi Meray Dil Say Pouchay, Saheliyaan, Maya, Mahi Ray and Miss You Kabhi Kabhi. She also appeared in dramas Tumhari Natasha, Ishqaaway, Thori Si Wafa, Kaisi Aurat Hoon Main and Dil Muhallay Ki Haveli. Since then she appeared in dramas Kasak Rahay Ge, Zakham, Baba Jani, Tera Yahan Koi Nahin and Fitrat.

Filmography

Television

Telefilm

References

External links
 
 
 
 

1990 births
Living people
Pakistani television actresses
21st-century Pakistani actresses